Velino Selo (Serbian Cyrillic: Велино Село) is a village in the municipality of Bijeljina, Republika Srpska, Bosnia and Herzegovina.

Geography 
The village is located on the border of Bosnia and Herzegovina with Serbia, on the banks of the Sava, a right tributary of the Danube.

History
During the May 2014 historic storm and flooding that hit the region, the river Sava overflowed and "sank" the entire village of Velino Selo.

References

Populated places in Bijeljina
Villages in Republika Srpska